Joined-Up Thinking is the first book by writer and artist Stevyn Colgan. It is based loosely upon the idea of Six Degrees of Separation first put forward by Frigyes Karinthy and later explored by Stanley Milgram and Richard Wiseman, in that everything and everyone in the world can be connected in some way. The book takes a light-hearted and humorous series of 'cyclic journeys through the land of trivia'. What marks the book as different from previous books of trivia is that each chapter or 'Round' takes the reader along a chain of interconnected facts ending, ultimately, back at the first fact in the chain. There are 30 of these 'journeys' in the book which are then all linked together in 'The Great Big Joined-Up Index' where Colgan shows the interconnectedness between facts in different Rounds.

Publication history
First published by Macmillan in Britain on 3 October 2008. The book received favourable comments from both Stephen Fry and John Mitchinson of Quite Interesting Ltd, co-author (with John Lloyd) of The Book of General Ignorance.

"I found myself strangely fascinated and somewhat dizzy. Most impressive" - Stephen Fry.

"The book that nails that odd, slightly unnerving feeling that everything really is connected" - John Mitchinson.

The paperback edition was released on 18 September 2009.

Critical reception
Response to the book has been positive to date.

'Dizzily intriguing' - The Bookseller 

'This is not a stocking filler - this is a real book. Buy several copies and keep one' - Daily Telegraph 

'Quite simply the best way to spend time when not shopping, sleeping or preparing food' - Tony Hawks 

'Can I recommend a book? It’s Joined-Up Thinking by Stevyn Colgan. The author shares my love of trivia’s interconnectedness - far from being ‘random info’, the facts in our brain only come to light because some other fact reminds us of them. It’s this quality that made me love the book - you almost want to have a conversation with it. For instance when it revealed that Charlie Chaplin was born on 16 April 1889, I wanted to say ‘that was only four days before the man he played (in all but name) in The Great Dictator (ie Adolf Hitler). The book’s packed with great info, from the derivation of the phrase ‘letting the cat out of the bag’ to the name for the thin bits of a cricket bail. Spigots, since you ask' - Mark Mason (author) 

'If you've ever looked at the Eiffel Tower and wondered how it's related to Dracula, then Stevyn Colgan is your man. Yes, it's trivia porn' - London Lite  

'He connects each piece of his trivia puzzle in a concise, chatty, easy to follow, even logical, manner. This free-flowing style does not, thankfully, lend itself to pause and evaluation, but does allow for a great deal of chuckling and chin-stroking. This is the sort of book that you will read and then spend the next month or so scratching your head and wondering just how it is, exactly, you know that avocados are poisonous, that indigo is really just a shade of violet, or that Wilma Flintstone had two maiden names, Pebble or Slaghoople, depending on which episode you watched, or that former British Prime Minister Tony Blair owns a telephone that resembles a Harley-Davidson. He is the master of the trivial, the collector and cataloguer of the forgotten and inane - but no matter how worthless and unnecessary the information, Colgan has the knack of making it all sound intensely fascinating' - New Zealand Herald  

'Stevyn Colgan has a theory; everything in the world can be connected through 'six degrees of information'. Trying to prove it takes us up some strange alleys - in the first chapter we go from Sir Isaac Newton inventing the colour indigo to 2007's most popular day for marriages - but his engaging style means we don't get stuck down the road of intellectual whimsy' - Maxim  

'The premise of the book is simple - the surprising connections between seemingly random and unrelated 'things', looped around so you keep meeting your tail. How Colgan manages to find all these connections, unravel them and create something coherent and entertaining out of them is beyond me. But I'm glad he took the time, as the result is vastly fascinating and had my mind whirring round after itself for hours - immense fun!' - Falmouth People

References

External links 
 Stevyn Colgan's Web site
 The Unbearable oddness of Stevyn Blog
 The Joined-Up Thinkers' Network

2008 non-fiction books
British books